Hecla and Griper Bay is an Arctic waterway. Located in the Hazen Strait, it is a large inlet in the north of Melville Island, Canada. It is split between the Northwest Territories and Nunavut.

Geography
Dominant landforms include: Long Point, Middle Point, Nias Point, and Cape Fisher on its western shores; Sabine Bay to the south; Eldridge Bay and the Sabine Peninsula to the east; and Macdougall Point at its northeastern opening.

References

Bays of the Northwest Territories
Bays of Qikiqtaaluk Region